Rutger Maclean may refer to:

Rutger Macklier (1688–1748), officer of Charles XII of Sweden
Rutger Macklean (1742–1816), Swedish land reformer